Turbonilla secura is a species of sea snail, a marine gastropod mollusk in the family Pyramidellidae, the pyrams and their allies.

References

External links
 To USNM Invertebrate Zoology Mollusca Collection
 To World Register of Marine Species

secura
Gastropods described in 1906